Timothy Christian is a private Christian school for students in pre-kindergarten through twelfth grade, located in Piscataway in Middlesex County, New Jersey, United States.

The campus of Timothy Christian School, founded in 1949, consists of nine buildings, which used to be called Camp Kilmer.  The school is an "interdenominational evangelical independent school that is fully accredited by ACSI and Middle States." The school has been accredited by the Middle States Association of Colleges and Schools Commission on Elementary and Secondary Schools since 2003 and its current accreditation expires in July 2023.

As of the 2019–20 school year, the school had an enrollment of 330 students (plus 19 in PreK) and 34.3 classroom teachers (on an FTE basis), for a student–teacher ratio of 9.6:1. The school's student body was 27.3% (90) Black, 26.7% (88) White, 17.3% (57) Hispanic, 14.8% (49) Asian, 7.3% (24) American Indian / Alaska Native and 6.7% (22) two or more races.

Athletics
The Timothy Christian School Tigers compete in the Greater Middlesex Conference, which is comprised of public and private high schools in the county and operates under the supervision of the New Jersey State Interscholastic Athletic Association (NJSIAA). School colors are blue and gold.

References

External links
 

1949 establishments in New Jersey
Christian schools in New Jersey
Educational institutions established in 1949
Private elementary schools in New Jersey
Private high schools in Middlesex County, New Jersey
Private middle schools in New Jersey
Piscataway, New Jersey